Sierzno  is a village in the administrative district of Gmina Bytów, within Bytów County, Pomeranian Voivodeship, in northern Poland.

The village has a population of 153.

History

People
 Paul Albert Grawitz (1850–1932) a German pathologist

Villages in Bytów County